The National Health Act 1953 (Cth) is an Act of the Parliament of Australia, which administers pharmaceutical, sickness and hospital benefits, alongside medical and dental services. The Act was passed in 1953 in the Fifth Menzies Ministry, under the second Menzies Government, with its "chief architect" being the then Minister for Health, Earle Page.

 provisions in the Act relating to the Pharmaceutical Benefits Scheme are still part of Australian law.

See also

List of Acts of the Parliament of Australia

References

External Links

 
Acts of the Parliament of Australia
1953 in Australian law
Healthcare in Australia
Health law in Australia